The Bruce Alberts Award for Excellence in Science Education is awarded annual by the American Society for Cell Biology. It is awarded to an individual who has demonstrated innovative and sustained contributions to science education, with particular emphasis on the broad local, regional, and/or national impact.

Awardees 
 2020 Steven Farber
 2020 Jamie Shuda
 2019 Mary Pat Wenderoth
 2018 Erin Dolan
 2017 Kimberly Tanner
 2016 David Lopatto
 2015 Deborah Harmon Hines 
 2014 Edison Fowlks 
 2013 Deborah Allen 
 2012 L.C. (Cam) Cameron
 2011 Peter Bruns
 2010 BioQUEST Curriculum Consortium
 2009 Manuel Berriozábal and Toby Horn
 2008 Wm. David Burns and Karen K. Oates
 2007 Patricia J. Pukkila
 2006 A. Malcolm Campbell and Sarah C.R. Elgin
 2005 Samuel Silverstein
 2004 William Wood
 2003 Nancy Hutchison
 2002 Sandra Mayrand
 2001 David Bynum
 2000 Virginia Shepherd
 1999 Eugenie Scott
 1998 Robert DeHaan

References 

Science education